Tommaso Colombaretti (born 26 June 1980) is an Italian football defender who currently plays for Fano.

In 2009, he was signed by Lanciano.

References

External links
 

1980 births
Living people
Sportspeople from the Province of Pesaro and Urbino
Italian footballers
A.S.D. Martina Calcio 1947 players
Calcio Foggia 1920 players
S.S. Virtus Lanciano 1924 players
Association football defenders
Footballers from Marche
People from Fano